An election to Devon County Council took place on 7 May 2009 as part of the 2009 United Kingdom local elections. The elections had been delayed from 7 May, to coincide with elections to the European Parliament. 62 councillors were elected from various electoral divisions, which returned either one or two county councillors each by first-past-the-post voting for a four-year term of office. The electoral divisions were the same as those used at the previous election in 2005. No elections were held in Plymouth and Torbay, which are unitary authorities outside the area covered by the County Council.

All locally registered electors (British, Irish, Commonwealth and European Union citizens) who were aged 18 or over on Thursday 2 May 2009 were entitled to vote in the local elections. Those who were temporarily away from their ordinary address (for example, away working, on holiday, in student accommodation or in hospital) were also entitled to vote in the local elections, although those who had moved abroad and registered as overseas electors cannot vote in the local elections. It is possible to register to vote at more than one address (such as a university student who had a term-time address and lives at home during holidays) at the discretion of the local Electoral Register Office, but it remains an offence to vote more than once in the same local government election.

Summary
The election saw the Liberal Democrats lose control of the council to the Conservatives. The Liberal Democrats were reduced to the second largest party and hence the official opposition. Devon was one of 2 county councils controlled by the Liberal Democrats, the other being Somerset County Council, both were lost to the Conservative Party.

Results

References

External links 
Devon County Council's webpage for 2009 elections

2009 English local elections
2009
2000s in Devon